Yanghe Township is a township under the administration of Ebian Yi Autonomous County, Sichuan, China. , it has four villages under its administration:
Gaowan Village
Moujia Village
Zhongzi Village
Yaya Village

See also 
 List of township-level divisions of Sichuan

References 

Township-level divisions of Sichuan
Ebian Yi Autonomous County